Damian Domagała (born 23 April 1998) is a Polish volleyball player. At the professional club level, he plays for GKS Katowice.

Career

Clubs
In July 2017, he signed a contract with Lechia Tomaszów Mazowiecki. A few days later, Italian club Tonno Callipo Calabria Vibo Valentia made a request to acquire Domagała, and as an agreement was reached, he made his debut in Serie A in the 2017–18 season.

National team
On 12 April 2015, the Polish national team, including Domagała, won a title of the U19 European Champions. They beat Italy in the final (3–1). He took part in the 2015 European Youth Olympic Festival, and on 1 August 2015 achieved a gold medal after the final match with Bulgaria (3–0). On 23 August 2015, Poland achieved its first title of the U19 World Champions. In the final his team beat hosts – Argentina (3–2).

On 10 September 2016, he achieved a title of the U20 European Champion after winning 7 out of 7 matches at the tournament, and beating Ukraine in the final (3–1). On 2 July 2017, Poland, including Domagała, achieved a title of the U21 World Champions after beating Cuba in the final (3–0). His national team won 47 matches in the row and never lost.

Honours

Youth national team
 2015  CEV U19 European Championship
 2015  European Youth Olympic Festival
 2015  FIVB U19 World Championship
 2016  CEV U20 European Championship
 2017  FIVB U21 World Championship

Universiade
 2019  Summer Universiade

References

External links

 
 Player profile at LegaVolley.it 
 Player profile at PlusLiga.pl 
 Player profile at Volleybox.net

1998 births
Living people
Sportspeople from Łódź
Polish men's volleyball players
Polish expatriate sportspeople in Italy
Expatriate volleyball players in Italy
Universiade medalists in volleyball
Medalists at the 2019 Summer Universiade
Universiade silver medalists for Poland
Cuprum Lubin players
Resovia (volleyball) players
GKS Katowice (volleyball) players
Opposite hitters